The Hindemith Prize of the City of Hanau is a music prize given by Hanau, Hesse, Germany and the Hindemith Foundation in Blonay (Switzerland), since 2000. Until 2004 the prize was called Paul Hindemith Prize for Art and Humanity of the City of Hanau in honour and remembrance of the composer Paul Hindemith. The prize consists of a certificate, a medal of honor in silver and €10,000. It is awarded biennially in recognition of outstanding musical achievement.

Recipients
2000: Albert Mangelsdorff
2002: Rolf Riehm
2004: Daniel Barenboim
2006: Tabea Zimmermann
2008: Gerd Albrecht
2010: Frank Peter Zimmermann
2012: Paavo Järvi
2014: Zehetmair Quartet
2016: Christoph Eschenbach
2019: Olli Mustonen
2022: Antoine Tamestit

References

Classical music awards
German music awards
Awards established in 2000